Jelena Dokic was the defending champion, but lost in third round to Anastasia Myskina.

Serena Williams won the title, by defeating Justine Henin 7–6(8–6), 6–4 in the final. It was the 3rd title for Williams in the season (and the 14th in her career), and her first clay-court title.

Seeds
The first eight seeds received a bye into the second round.

Draw

Finals

Top half

Section 1

Section 2

Bottom half

Section 3

Section 4

Qualifying

Seeds

Qualifiers

Lucky losers

Qualifying draw

First qualifier

Second qualifier

Third qualifier

Fourth qualifier

Fifth qualifier

Sixth qualifier

Seventh qualifier

Eighth qualifier

Ninth qualifier

Tenth qualifier

Eleventh qualifier

Twelfth qualifier

External links
 Official results archive (ITF)
 Official results archive (WTA)

Women's Singles
Italian Open - Singles